{{Album ratings
| rev1 = Allmusic
| rev1Score =  <ref name="Chrispell">{{cite web|url=|title=Jack Ingram — Jack Ingram|last=Chrispell|first=James|date=|work=Allmusic|accessdate=2009-12-06}}</ref>
}}Jack Ingram''' is the debut studio album by country music artist Jack Ingram. Initially released independently in 1993, it was then the first of three albums released by Ingram on the Crystal Clear Sound label in 1995. No singles were released from this album. Most of the tracks from this album were re-released on the studio album Young Man in 2004 along with tracks from his second studio album, Lonesome Questions.

Content
The majority of the album's tracks were written by Ingram. The opening track "Beat Up Ford" would become Ingram's trademark song in his early career as well as the name of his back-up band. It would be re-recorded for his second studio album, Lonesome Question. The track "Make My Heart Flutter" would be re-recorded as "Flutter" on Ingram's 1997 album Livin' or Dyin'.

The album also features several covers of classic songs. Merle Haggard's "Mama Tried" was first recorded by him in 1968 on the album of the same name. The album closes with covers of Willie Nelson's "Pick up the Tempo" from the 1978 album Waylon & Willie'' and Robert Earl Keen's 1989 song "The Road Goes on Forever".

Critic Bill Hobbs characterized the album as "a starker, more folk-leaning disc" compared to its follow-up.

Track listing
All tracks composed by Jack Ingram unless noted

Personnel
Taken from liner notes.
Colin Boyd - electric guitar, harmonica, background vocals
Jim Cocke - piano, keyboards, melodica
Eric Delegard - bass guitar
Brian Hartig - drums
Jack Ingram - lead vocals, acoustic guitar, drums
Clay Pendergrass - bass guitar
Cary Pierce - acoustic guitar, background vocals
Terry Slemmons - acoustic guitar, percussion, electric guitar, background vocals
Rob Wilson - bass guitar

References
Allmusic (see infobox)

1995 debut albums
Jack Ingram albums